Milford Academy is a post-secondary school founded in 1916 as Yale Preparatory School. It has been located in New Berlin, New York since 2004. Although founded as a preparatory school, its current focus is as a school for athletes who have the potential to play sports at the collegiate level, but are not yet academically ready.

Hall of Fame
Whenever an alumnus is drafted or signed by a professional sports team, his photo is enshrined in the Milford Academy Hall of Fame. The Hall of Fame Room is dedicated to former students and displays their photos and memorabilia.

Notable alumni 
Antonio Anderson, Professional basketball player
Cameron Artis-Payne, NFL player
Horace Brigham Claflin, Merchant; Founder of H.B. Claflin & Company
Albie Booth Yale football star
Matt Brown, Professional football player
Mike Carlson UK journalist, author and sports commentator
Yinka Dare, Professional basketball player
Tyrique Jarrett, NFL player
Terrance Knighton, NFL player
Tyler Matakevich, NFL player; Temple Owls football player and All-American
LeSean McCoy, NFL player
Christian Peter, NFL player
Jason Peter, NFL player
Andrew I. Porter, Science fiction editor
Vincent Price, Actor
Travon Van, CFL Superstar

References

External links
 

Milford Academy alumni
Private high schools in Connecticut
Private high schools in New York (state)
Boys' schools in the United States
Schools in New Haven County, Connecticut
Educational institutions established in 1916
1916 establishments in Connecticut
Schools in Chenango County, New York